Nagoa is a village in the Bardez sub-district of Goa, and lies between the North Goa headquarters town of Mapusa and the tourist-destination and former fishing village of Calangute. It is not to be mixed-up with a village of the same name which lies in the South Goa sub-district of Salcete.

Area, population
According to the official 2011 Census, Nagoa has an area of 154.57 hectares, a total of 351 households, a population of 1,455 (comprising 732 males and 723 females) with an under-six years population of 124 (comprising 64 boys and 60 girls).

Location
The village of Nagoa lies close to Arpora, Saligao and Parra villages of Bardez.

Tourism destination
In recent times, Nagoa in Bardez has become home to many starred tourism. It lies close to Arpora, a region once known for its traditional salt-pans, at times when Goa's salt production was famous and exported far and wide.

Recent issues
The spurt of tourism in the area has also brought in issues like narcotic drugs.

There have been issues of illegal road construction.

References

Villages in North Goa district